"Love Don't Take Over" is a 2014 song by house producers George Jackson and Marc Mitchell under their common alias MG Select, featuring lead vocals by CeCe Peniston. The single was released as a digital single through Ruff N' Tuff Records on September 16, 2014.

Credits and personnel
 Management
 Recording studios – Fragile Music Group Studios, Homewood; Prairie Cat Mastering, Belvidere, Illinois (Director's Cut; remixing and mastering)
 Publishing – Tija Music (BMI), Hypemarck Music and CeCe Pen Music (ASCAP)

 Production
 Writers – Cecilia Peniston, Evette Clark, George Jackson, Marc Mitchell
 Producers – Jackson and Mitchell ; Francis Nicholls  and Eric Kupper 
 Mixing – Slavic Livins
 Remixing – Knuckles and Kupper
 Mastering – Mark Richardson 

 Personnel
 Vocals – Peniston
 Backing vocals – Clark  
 Performers – Jackson and Mitchell
 Cover art and design – Herbert Lee Holloway, MixTape Cover King, Omaha, Nebraska

Track listing and format
 MD, EU & US, #RNT0011
 "Love Don't Take Over (Director's Cut Signature Mix)" - 7:46
 "Love Don't Take Over (Director's Cut Signature Instrumental)" - 7:44
 "Love Don't Take Over (Director's Cut Signature Radio Edit)" - 3:03
 "Love Don't Take Over (Original Mix)" - 7:07
 "Love Don't Take Over (Original Instrumental)" - 7:07
 "Love Don't Take Over (Original Radio Edit)" - 3:25

References

General

 Specific

External links 
 

2014 singles
CeCe Peniston songs
2014 songs
Songs written by George Jackson (songwriter)
Songs written by CeCe Peniston